FC Maiwand Kabul  is a football team based in Afghanistan, playing in the Kabul Premier League. The club was founded by Muhammad Kabir Turkmany as Nowbahar Football Club and since 1976 it has been known as Maiwand Juice. The club is a cultural and sporting organisation, active in wrestling, taekwondo and football.

References

External links
Archived website
Afghanistan – Data before 2002 (rsssf.com)
Maiwand (weltfussball.de)
Maiwand FC (national-football-teams.com)

Football clubs in Afghanistan
Sport in Kabul
Association football clubs established in 1952
1952 establishments in Afghanistan